Giovanni Urbinati (aka Gio) is an Italian ceramist and sculptor. 
He currently lives in Rimini, Italy, and he has been exhibited both in Italy and abroad.

Biography 

Giovanni Urbinati started the ceramist craft in 1965 at the atelier “Ceramica Stella Alpina”.
In the 1969 he opened his first workshop in Rimini and he started his research on materials, glazes and luster. 
Gio' mould and fired any kind of earth : clay, gres, porcelain and even earth from his garden.

In 1988, he met Tonino Guerra and since then they started a collaboration that brought them  to create in 1990 the exhibition “La Cattedrale dove va a dormire il mare/The Cathedral where the sea goes to sleep”  at the deconsecrated church in Budrio near Bologna.

In 1991, Gio' made in Bascio Alta, a village close to Pennabilli, the “Petrified garden” by a Tonino Guerra idea. 
This project consisted in seven ceramic carpets and each one was dedicated to an historical figure that was important in the Alta Valmarecchia area. Again, in collaboration with Tonino Guerra in 1995 he made the ceramic sculpture “ The Arch of tale for the eyes of childhood”  inside the garden of forgotten fruits of Pennabilli.

In 2003, he made the “ Grande foglia/ The Big leaf” for Palazzo Mareo, the palace designed by Massimiliano Fuksas in Rimini Marina Centro.

In 2011, he exhibited in the Museum of Rimini  his thirty years of production.

The work of Giovanni Urbinati is exhibited at the Art Gallery Nera Contemporanea of Bologna, at the Ceramic International Museum of Faenza, Civic Museum of Gualdo Tadino, Civic Museum of Pesaro, Ceramic Art International Museum of Castelli in Abruzzo and at the Vatican Museum.

Notes and references

External links 
  official website

Living people
20th-century Italian sculptors
20th-century Italian male artists
Italian male sculptors
21st-century Italian sculptors
Italian ceramists
Italian contemporary artists
1946 births
21st-century ceramists
21st-century Italian male artists